The 2015 Barnsley Metropolitan Borough Council election took place on 7 May 2015 to elect members of Barnsley Metropolitan Borough Council in England as part of the  2015 United Kingdom local elections.  Councillors retiring at this election were Cllrs. Betty Barlow (Worsborough); Tracey Cheetham (Royston); Brian Key (Darfield); and Tom Sheard (Kingstone) (all L); Dave North (North East) and Brian Perrin (Dodworth) from the Barnsley Independent Group; and Anne Rusby (Penistone West) (C).

Results 
Labour maintained control winning 19 of the 21 seats up for election. The Conservatives won the other 2 seats.

After the election the political make up of the council was:

By-elections between 2015 and 2016

References

2015 English local elections
May 2015 events in the United Kingdom
2015
2010s in South Yorkshire